Caroline Williams (born 1957) is an American actress and producer

Caroline Williams may also refer to:

 Caroline Fanny Williams (1839–1886), English landscape painter
 Caroline Randall Williams (born 1987), American author, poet and academic
 Caroline Ransom Williams (1872–1952), Egyptologist and classical archaeologist